The Sweden women's national beach handball team is the national women's beach handball team of Sweden and is controlled by the Swedish Handball Association. Their best result in the European Championship is from Cádiz 2002, when Sweden finished in 6th place. The team has never participated in the World Championships.

Results

European Beach Handball Championship

Beach handball
Women's national beach handball teams
B